The Teatro Monumental (Monumental Theatre) is a concert hall in Madrid. The theatre, designed by Teodoro Anasagasti Algan, was built between 1922 and 1923 as a movie theatre (Teatro Cinema Monumental) and later was transformed to house concerts of different genres, from pop to classical, and jazz to folk.

The theatre is the concert venue of the RTVE Symphony Orchestra. It has a 4,200 capacity.

See also 
 Madrid Symphony Orchestra
 Community of Madrid Orchestra
 National Auditorium of Music
 RTVE Symphony Orchestra
 Queen Sofía Chamber Orchestra
 Joven Orquesta Nacional de España
 Teatro Real
 Zarzuela
 Teatro Pavón

References

External links

  (Website of the Orquesta de RTVE)

Entertainment venues in Madrid
Concert halls in Spain
Theatres in Madrid
Buildings and structures in Cortes neighborhood, Madrid
Former cinemas in Madrid